The Troubles were an ethno-nationalist conflict in Northern Ireland during the late 20th century.

The term had earlier been used to describe the Irish revolutionary period in the early twentieth century.

Troubles or The Troubles may also refer to:

Military or political clashes 
Great troubles (1359–1381), the civil war of the Golden Horde
Time of Troubles, a period of Russian history 1598–1613
Texas Troubles, a slave insurrection panic in 1860
Corsican conflict or French Troubles, from 1976
Troubles at Frankfurt, quarrels of the Marian exiles in Frankfurt am Main in the mid-1550s
Basque conflict or Spanish Troubles, 1959-2011

Arts and entertainment 
Troubles (novel), by J. G. Farrell, 1970
Troubles, a British band including former members of Hope of the States
Troubles (Steve Lacy album) or the title song, 1979
"Troubles", a song by Alicia Keys from Songs in A Minor, 2001
The Troubles (album), by the Wolfe Tones, 2004
"The Troubles", a song by U2 from Songs of Innocence, 2014
The Troubles (Haven), supernatural afflictions in the TV series Haven
"The Troubles" (Law & Order), a television episode

See also 
 
 
 Trouble (disambiguation)
 Deep Trouble (disambiguation)
 Double Trouble (disambiguation)
 Irish revolutionary period in the early twentieth century